Gary Gabelich (Croatian Gabelić; August 29, 1940 – January 26, 1984) was an American motorsport driver who set the Fédération Internationale de l'Automobile (FIA) Land Speed Record (LSR) with the rocket car Blue Flame on October 23, 1970,  on a dry lake bed at Bonneville Salt Flats near Wendover, Utah.

Personal life

Gary Gabelich was born 29 August 1940 and was raised in southern California and attended Long Beach Polytechnic High School. He grew up during the height of the Southern California race scene and became friends with many famous racers of the era like drag racer Tom McEwen. The nearby Lions Drag Strip was adjacent to Long Beach and he was influenced by the NHRA drag racing legend Big Joe Reath of the Reath Automotive Speed Shop in Long Beach. Gabelich married Rae Marie Ramsey (born 1946). She graduated Palo Alto High School Palo Alto, CA in 1964 and moved to Long Beach in 1968. Guy Michael Gabelich was born in the early 1980s. She was a flight attendant for United Airlines. 
Gabelich's father was of Croatian American descent and his mother was Mexican American.

Gabelich died in January 1984 in a motorcycle crash.  After his widow Rae Marie retired from United Airlines in 2003, she was elected to the Long Beach City Council in 2004, where she served for eight years.

Career
Gabelich drove a split window 1960 era Volkswagen delivery van for Vermillion's Drug store in his younger days. He lived with his parents in the Bixby Knolls area of Long Beach, California during this time. He later went to work for North American Aviation which became North American Rockwell after a 1967 merger with Rockwell-Standard. Gabelich started in the mail room and stayed for nine years in various positions from staff assistant before becoming a part-time test subject for Project Apollo in the years 1968 and 1969. Gabelich served as an Apollo test astronaut in 1968-1969 as stated on the plaque his family dedicated to him in 2001.

Unlike the actual astronauts, he was not flying the capsules, but testing their long-term viability in weightless conditions, their tolerance and performance under conditions of extreme lateral forces and, though they seldom spoke of it on televised moon shots, the toilet facilities.  Gabelich was Mercury Seven astronaut Wally Schirra's exact size and he did a lot of space checkout for him and testing of capsules and equipment before they were man-rated for operational use.  Project Mercury ended in the early 1960s and Wally Schirra went on to become commander of Apollo 7.

Land speed record

The thrust used during this attempt was between 13,000 pounds (58,000 newtons) and 15,000 pounds (67,000 newtons).

The FIA rules dictate that a land speed mark is recognized only after two runs through the FIA measured kilometer and mile courses. The two corresponding speeds are then averaged for the official time and speed. Additionally both runs must be made within one hour.

The mile FIA LSR was the first exceeding  and remained unbeaten until 1983, when Richard Noble broke it driving Thrust 2. The faster kilometer FIA LSR remained unbroken for 27 years when ThrustSSC went supersonic in 1997.

Racing career

In 1969 Gabelich established a quarter mile Drag boat record of   This is not the same as the Union Internationale Motonautique (UIM) Water Speed Record (WSR) in which Donald Campbell broke  on 23 July 1955 in the Bluebird K7.

Gabelich was seriously injured in the crash of an experimental 4 wheel drive Funny Car in 1972  that careened out of control at  during a quarter mile run almost severing his left forearm and broke his left leg so severely that more than a year later he still wore a cast.  This incident ended his racing career and he never raced again, concentrating instead on a new supersonic vehicle.

After racing

In the early 1980s he established the "Rocketman Corporation" with Tom Daniel. The objective was to design and build a vehicle capable of reaching speeds in the  range. This conceptual vehicle was named "American Way"  but the project was cut short by his untimely death in January 1984 in a motorcycle crash.

Gabelich was part of the cast in the 1977 movie Joyride to Nowhere and he made a documentary, One Second from Eternity: The History of the Land Speed Record in 1971. Gabelich and his family appeared on Family Feud with Richard Dawson, where he presented the key to the city of Long Beach, California to Dawson.

In 2008 Gabelich was inducted into the Long Beach Motorsports Walk of Fame in front of the Convention Center on Pine Avenue. He was represented at the ceremony by his wife Rae,  a Long Beach City Councilwoman who retired in 2012 after eight years of service.

He was inducted into the Motorsports Hall of Fame of America in 2016.

See also 
 Blue Flame
 Land speed record
 Rocket car

References

External links
 Blue Flame 
 Gary Gabelich 
 Break the Record - Blue Flame LSR video 

1940 births
1984 deaths
American racing drivers
Land speed record people
Bonneville 300 MPH Club members
American people of Croatian descent
American people of Mexican descent
Road incident deaths in California
Long Beach Polytechnic High School alumni